Magdalena Woźniczka (born 11 April 1997) is a Polish volleyball player, playing in position outside hitter. Since the 2020/2021 season, she has played for Libero VIP Biesiadowo Aleksandrów Łódzki.

Her twin sister Maria is also a volleyball player.

Sporting achievements

Clubs 
Polish Junior Championships:
  2015

References

External links
 TauronLiga profile
 1LigaKobiet.VolleyStation profile
 Women.Volleybox profile
 CEV profile

1997 births
Living people
Polish women's volleyball players